Paolo Salvati (born 22 February 1939 in Rome – 24 June 2014 in Rome) was an Italian figurative artist, painter, and draftsman. His landscapes are the expression of poetic art, characterized by an intense chromatic tone as a metaphorical depiction of the inner world of man.

Biography

Paolo Salvati was born in Rome on 22 February 1939, in a house on Via Labicana.  Expressionist painter, from 1967 exhibited a series of works in oil on canvas throughout cities in Sardinia such as Cagliari, Oristano, Bosa, Ghilarza, Paulilatino until 1969.  Since 1970 he participated in exhibitions of plastic and figurative art in the church Trinità dei Monti and in Galleria Colonna renamed Galleria Alberto Sordi in Rome.

He painted subjects figment of the imagination, such as Pietra Blu in 1973 and 1974, Sogni di Primavera d’Alta Montagna in 1974, d’Estate in 1975, the paintings Alberi Blu in 1980, and Montagna Gialla in 1991; subsequently created a  series called Fronde Rosse in 1993, 1994, and 2000.  He also realized landscapes, seascapes, and portraits.  He used the techniques colours oil on canvas, gouache, pastels, acrylic, and personally prepared canvases and frames which were used in his works. From 1977 to 1993 he worked as a portrait painter in Piazza Navona in Rome; he used pastels on paper, oil on canvas painting miniatures depicting Roman monuments and landscapes of fantasy, produced numerous portraits also oil on canvas.

Expert in designing and making frames on wooden base, research techniques to the preparation of adhesives or for the application of real gold and silver leaf.  His passion for guitar music concert lead him to engage in lute making.
He became closer with painter and his maternal uncle  Gabriele Patriarca, and with Rinaldo Caressa (painter), Roberto Venturoni, with whom he shared some of the exhibitions, such as Cento Pittori via Margutta and paint-off demonstration. In  the summer of 1993 he left Piazza Navona due to the encounters with a collector of works of art Don Agostino Chigi Albani della Rovere (1929–2002).

In the 1990 he won first prizes in different editions of paint-off: in December 1996 he received the prize Artitalia at the Exhibition of Contemporary Art in Galleria l’Agostiniana in Rome; in 1995 he exposed the painting Scogliera in Notturno oil on canvas 50×60; in August 2000 he was awarded the first prize at the fourth edition of the competition of paint-off of Anticoli Corrado with a 50×60 oil on canvas painting depicting La Fonte Vecchia; between November 2000 and January 2001 he performed at the Galleria Gesù e Maria in Via del Corso in Rome, at the beginning with a solo exhibition then participated in the exhibition of painting and sculpture “Jubilee Events in time and in the present” organized in order to celebrate the closing of the Great Jubilee. On 13 December 2005 is recognized illustrious citizen from the Lazio region.

In 2006 Salvati met the critic Andrea De Liberi and his biography appeared in the journal Cultura published by Istituto Europeo delle Politiche Culturali ed Ambientali. In July 2009 in Trani he knew the art critic Paolo Levi, then artistic director of the Catalogue of Modern Art Giorgio Mondadori, and participated in the Biennial of Contemporary Art, exhibition curated by Giuseppe De Nittis foundation which takes place in rooms used for the exhibitions in Castello Svevo. On 20 and 21 October 2012, the pilot Andrea Palma, during the trial and race in the national racetrack in Monza, displayed a copy of a portrait painted by Salvati, a color print positioned on the bonnet of the Ferrari 430.

On 27 December 2012, on a proposal from the Presidency of the Council of Ministers, he has been honoured with the title of Knight of the Order of Merit of the Italian Republic. In 2019 the Paolo Salvati Onlus association was legally established, which supports the memory of the artist and holds the Paolo Salvati Archive, for the updating of the general catalog of the works.

Gallery

Bibliography

 Catalog of Modern Art No. 45, Paul Levi, Daniela Brignone; Mario Guderzo; Lea Mattarella, "The Italian Astist from the early twentieth century to today” (Gli Artisti Italiani dal Primo Novecento ad Oggi), Giorgio Mondadori, Milan, 2009, pp. 176–358. .
 Catalog of Modern Art No. 46, Paul Levi, Daniela Brignone; Mario Guderzo; Lea Mattarella, "The Italian Artist from the early twentieth century to today" (Gli Artisti Italiani dal Primo Novecento ad Oggi), Giorgio Mondadori, Milan, 2010, pp. 192, 352–353. .
 Catalog of Modern Art No. 47, in Paul Levi, Daniela Brignone; Mario Guderzo; Lea Mattarella, "The Italian Astist from the early twentieth century to today"( Gli Artisti Italiani dal Primo Novecento ad Oggi)  Giorgio Mondadori, Milan, 2011, pp. 192–379. .
 Catalog of Modern Art No 48, in Paul Levi Young Faccenda; Daniela Brignone; Mario Guderzo; Lea Mattarella, "The Italian Artist from the early twentieth century to today"(Gli Artisti Italiani dal Primo Novecento ad Oggi), Giorgio Mondadori, Milan, 2012, pp. 27, 392, 401–404. .
 Catalog, (Paolo Salvati 1939-2014 : geniale creazione visiva) Eredi Salvati, Roma, 2016.
 Via Margutta Storia della Strada degli Artisti e dei Cento Pittori, in Luigi Salvatori, Eventi d'Arte Cento Pittori via Margutta, Roma, 2021. 
 Michela Ramadori, I dipinti raffiguranti la Pietra blu di Paolo Salvati, Ut pictura Poesis, Editions of Italian Modern and Contemporary Art Archives, Roma, 2021. 
 Alberto Moioli, Le marine di Paolo Salvati, Editions of Italian Modern and Contemporary Art Archives, Roma, 2022.

Paintings in museums
 Museum of Modern and Contemporary Art, Artists present at Anticoli between the 19th and 21st century of Anticoli Corrado.

See also

 Expressionism
 Anticoli Corrado
 Cento Pittori via Margutta

Notes

Other websites 

 
 Official website of Culture Lazio, Website of Culture, Arts and Sports of the Lazio Region
 Official page on Facebook
 Paolo Salvati, biography on Artprice.com
 Paolo Salvati, biography on Mutualart.com
 Paolo Salvati, biography on Askart.com

1939 births
2014 deaths
20th-century Italian painters
Italian male painters
21st-century Italian painters
Painters from Rome
Italian contemporary artists
20th-century Italian male artists
21st-century Italian male artists